Kathryn Irene Glascock (1901 – February 23, 1923) was an American poet. The Kathryn Irene Glascock Intercollegiate Poetry Contest is named after her.

Early life and education
Glascock was born in 1901 to parents Hugh Grundy Glascock, an educator, and Etta (or Ella) Bodine Woods. She was raised in Culver, Indiana. Glascock graduated from Mount Holyoke College in 1922.

At Mount Holyoke, she was editor of the school newspaper, and was elected to Phi Beta Kappa. Glascock worked as a magazine editor in New York after college.

Legacy 
In her memory, her parents established the annual Kathryn Irene Glascock Intercollegiate Poetry Contest at Mount Holyoke College in 1923. The contest became an intercollegiate event in 1924. In addition, Glascock's parents also published a collection of her poetry entitled, Poems, and had one of her poems, "Daylight," published in Poetry Magazine.

She died there in 1923, from pneumonia.

Poetry
Poems.  Garden City, N.Y. : Country Life Press, 1923.
"Daylight," Poetry Magazine, Volume 22, May 1923, Page 83.

Notes

External links
Mount Holyoke College Archives: Glascock Contest
Glascock Poetry Contest

1901 births
1923 deaths
Mount Holyoke College alumni
American women poets
20th-century American poets
20th-century American women writers
Writers from Indiana